USS Defiance may refer to the following ships of the United States Navy: 

 , a cargo vessel in service from 1918–1919
 , a coastal minesweeper that served during World War II
 , a patrol gunboat that served from 1969 until 1973 when it was transferred to Turkey

See also
 Defiance (disambiguation)
 

United States Navy ship names